Rabbit Granger was an American Negro league outfielder in the 1900s.

Granger played for the Indianapolis ABCs in 1908. In six recorded games, he posted five hits in 27 plate appearances.

References

External links
Baseball statistics and player information from Baseball-Reference Black Baseball Stats and Seamheads

Year of birth missing
Year of death missing
Place of birth missing
Place of death missing
Indianapolis ABCs players
Baseball outfielders